Bazhenovo may refer to:

Bazhenovo, Belebeyevsky District, Republic of Bashkortostan, a locality in Republic of Bashkortostan
Bazhenovo, Birsky District, Republic of Bashkortostan, a locality in Republic of Bashkortostan

See also
Bazhenov